Middlesbrough is a railway station on the Durham Coast Line, Esk Valley Line and Tees Valley Line. The station serves the town of Middlesbrough in North Yorkshire, England. It is owned by Network Rail and managed by TransPennine Express.

According to the Office of Rail and Road statistics, Middlesbrough railway station is the fourth busiest in the North East region, with 1,210,906 total entries and exits (2021–22 period).

History

The first railway line was opened in the area as long ago as December 1830, as an extension of the Stockton and Darlington Railway, to connect with the port of the (then new) town of Middlesbrough. From the opening of the line until 1837, passengers were served by a wooden shed on the route to the riverside coal staithes. The line was extended to the new exchange along Commercial Street in 1837, with a new station being constructed two years later. This new, more substantial station was opened by the S&DR in 1839.

In June 1846, a branch line extending eastwards from the Stockton and Darlington Railway towards Redcar was opened by the Middlesbrough and Redcar Railway. Situated on the Redcar branch line on the southern edge of the new town, a new passenger station was designed by John Middleton, which opened on 26 July 1847.

As the town expanded rapidly southwards during the second half of the nineteenth century, the station was unable to cope with the increased traffic. Due to the design of the station not lending itself to expansion, it was subsequently demolished in 1874. It was replaced by the current, much larger station, which opened in December 1877. The Commercial Street station, becoming increasingly isolated from the town by the opening of the Redcar branch line, became a goods station, before eventually being demolished.

The current station was designed by the North Eastern Railway's chief architect, William Peachey, with an ornate Gothic style frontage. Behind this, an overall roof of elliptical design once existed. Constructed out of wrought iron of lattice design, with glass covering the middle half, and timber (inside) and slate (outside) covering the outer quarters. The two end screens were glazed with timber cladding around the outer edges. The roof was high in relation to its width.

The elliptical roof was severely damaged in a German daylight air raid, which took place on the afternoon of 3 August 1942. It was eventually removed in 1954, to be replaced by the current design over the concourse and platforms.

A major refurbishment of the station took place during 2017 and 2018, with repairs carried out to the station's roof and stonework, as well as the upgrading of the Wood Street car park. New information screens were also installed as part of the refurbishment.

As part of a major upgrade to the station, platform 2 was extended in the first half of 2021, allowing for a new direct service from Middlesbrough to London King's Cross. On 13 December 2021, a London North Eastern Railway Class 800 Azuma departed from the station at 07:08am, the first direct service to the capital since 1988.

Facilities

The main station layout consists of an entrance hall with ticket office, large concourse/waiting area and two covered platforms that are each subdivided into two sections. Platform 1 is divided into two sub-platforms (1a and 1b), as is platform 2 (2a and 2b). Two freight lines bypass to the north of the station.

The station is staffed and has a range of facilities including a cafe/bar, newsagent's shop, cycle storage, toilets and lifts. A number of information screens throughout the station provide information on train arrivals and departures.

Car parking is situated to the east of the station and can be accessed via Exchange Square and Wood Street, and by footpath directly to the station. A drop-off point is located at the front of the station, close to the main entrance.

Future 
As part of a £34 million redevelopment plan to improve the overall layout of the station, existing buildings are being revamped including the undercroft and ticket office area, refurbishment of the existing stonework is taking place and the station main entrance is to be relocated. New station offices and staircases are included in the plans with a proposed completion date of July 2023.

A new platform 3 is also planned to be built to the north of platform 2 fronting onto Bridge Street West, giving the station increased capacity to accommodate more trains.

Services

London North Eastern Railway
As of the December 2021 timetable change, London North Eastern Railway operate a once per weekday return service to London King's Cross, calling at Thornaby and York. More services are planned following the completion of station works.

Rolling stock used: Class 800 Azuma

Northern Trains

Durham Coast Line

As of the May 2021 timetable change, the station is served by an hourly service between Newcastle and Middlesbrough. Most trains continue to Hexham (or Carlisle on Sunday) and Nunthorpe. Two trains per day (three on Sunday) continue to Whitby.

Rolling stock used: Class 156 Super Sprinter and Class 158 Express Sprinter

Esk Valley Line

Following the May 2021 timetable change, the station is served by an hourly service between Middlesbrough and Nunthorpe, with two trains per day (excluding Sunday) continuing to Battersby, and six per day (four on Sunday) continuing to Whitby. Most trains continue to Newcastle via Hartlepool.

Rolling stock used: Class 156 Super Sprinter and Class 158 Express Sprinter

Tees Valley Line

As of the May 2021 timetable change, the station is served by two trains per hour between Saltburn and Darlington via Middlesbrough, with one train per hour extending to Bishop Auckland. An hourly service operates between Saltburn and Bishop Auckland on Sunday.

Rolling stock used: Class 156 Super Sprinter and Class 158 Express Sprinter

TransPennine Express
As of the December 2022 timetable change, the station is served by an hourly service between Saltburn and Manchester Airport via York. Most services run via Yarm, with the exception of one early morning arrival which travels via Darlington.

Rolling stock used: Class 185 Desiro

Gallery

Notes

References

Bibliography

External links

Railway stations in Middlesbrough
Grade II listed railway stations
Former North Eastern Railway (UK) stations
Railway stations in Great Britain opened in 1877
Railway stations served by TransPennine Express
Northern franchise railway stations
John Middleton railway stations
William Peachey railway stations
DfT Category C1 stations
Railway stations served by London North Eastern Railway